That Day, on the Beach is a 1983 Taiwanese New Wave drama and the first feature film by Edward Yang. The film deals with two old friends, played by Sylvia Chang and Terry Hu, who encounter each other in Taipei. Yang had to convince the film's production company to allow Christopher Doyle to shoot the film; Doyle would go on to win the Best Cinematography prize at the 1983 Asia-Pacific Film Festival for his work on That Day, on the Beach. Yang's fellow Taiwanese New Wave director Hou Hsiao-hsien also plays a role in the film.

The film is sometimes cited as the first in the Taiwanese New Wave.

References 

General references

1983 films
1983 drama films
Taiwanese drama films
1980s Mandarin-language films